Iona Macintyre is a scholar and translator, specializing in Latin American culture and literature. She studied at the University of Glasgow, and did her PhD at the University of Nottingham. She now teaches at the University of Edinburgh.

She and Fiona Macintosh's Spanish-English co-translation of The Adventures of China Iron by author Gabriela Cabezón Cámara was published by Charco Press and shortlisted for the International Booker Prize in 2020.  The novel is a re-telling of Martín Fierro, an Argentinian literary classic.

She was one of the translators into English of Escape Goat, the 2020 Portuguese Covid-inspired lockdown novel, brought out by the publisher Relógio D'Água.

References

British translators
Year of birth missing (living people)
Living people
Alumni of the University of Glasgow
Alumni of the University of Nottingham